Jerry Tuttle may refer to:
Jerry Tuttle (American football) (1926–2006), American football quarterback
Jerry O. Tuttle (1934–2018), United States Navy admiral